Primera División de México (Mexican First Division) Clausura 2007 is a Mexican football tournament - one of two short tournaments that take up the entire year - to determine the champion(s) of Mexican football. It began on Friday, January 19, 2007, and ran until April 29, when the regular season ended. UAG and UANL inaugurated the season with a match in which UAG won 2-1. Reigning champions Guadalajara were eliminated in semifinals by archrivals América and thus could not retain their title. Querétaro, who finished last in the percentage table, were relegated to Primera División A at the end of the season. On May 27, Pachuca defeated América 3-2 and became champions for the fifth time.

Overview

Final standings (groups)

League table

Relegation

Top goalscorers 
Players sorted first by goals scored, then by last name. Only regular season goals listed.

Source: MedioTiempo

Results

Playoffs

Repechage

Santos Laguna won 2–1 on aggregate.

1–1 on aggregate. Atlas advanced for being the higher seeded team.

Bracket

Quarterfinals

Guadalajara won 6–3 on aggregate.

Cruz Azul won 2–0 on aggregate.

2–2 on aggregate. Pachuca advanced for being the higher seeded team.

América won 7–4 on aggregate.

Semifinals

Pachuca were awarded a walkover after Cruz Azul was suspended one match for fielding suspended player Salvador Carmona in the first leg.

América won 2–0 on aggregate.

Finals

Pachuca won 3–2 on aggregate.

Doping scandal
Salvador Carmona of Cruz Azul was charged of doping before his semifinal match against Pachuca. Regardless, Isaac Mizrahi, Cruz Azul's coach, illegally included Carmona in the starting lineup. For this, the FMF fined Cruz Azul a one-game suspension, thus disqualifying them from playing the semifinal's second leg. This means that Cruz Azul was prematurely eliminated from the playoffs, and that Pachuca were automatically qualified for the final.

The Court of Arbitration for Sport has imposed a much harsher punishment on Carmona: he is banned from playing any professional match anywhere in the world for life, thus ending his career early.

References 

Mexico
Clausura